Kelly Ann Lynch (born January 31, 1959) is an American actress and model. Her notable film roles include Cocktail, Road House, Drugstore Cowboy, Curly Sue. and TV show roles in The L Word (2004–2005, 2009), and Magic City (2012–2013).

Early life 
Lynch was born in Golden Valley, Minnesota, the daughter of Barbara, a modern dancer, and Robert Lynch, a restaurateur. She attended the Guthrie Theater. She worked as a flight attendant after leaving college and worked as a model for the Elite modeling agency before acting.

Career 
After several small roles, Lynch was cast in her breakthrough role in the feature film Cocktail (1988).
In 1989, Lynch starred opposite Patrick Swayze in the action film Road House, and was nominated for the Independent Spirit Award for Best Female Lead for her performance in the crime drama Drugstore Cowboy, directed by Gus Van Sant. She was also nominated for an Independent Spirit Award for The Beans of Egypt, Maine (1994). She turned down the role of Catherine Tramell in Basic Instinct (1992).

Lynch later had leading roles in a number of independent movies and co-starred in several Hollywood feature films, including Desperate Hours (1990), Curly Sue (1991), Three of Hearts (1993),  Imaginary Crimes (1994), Virtuosity (1995), Heaven's Prisoners (1996), Mr. Magoo (1997), and Homegrown (1998). In the 2000s, Lynch has had supporting roles in the films Charlie's Angels (2000), Joe Somebody (2001), and The Jacket (2005).
 
On television, Lynch had the recurring role of Ivan Aycock from 2004 to 2009 in the Showtime drama series The L Word. She later joined the cast of The CW teen soap 90210 (2010–2011) as Laurel Cooper. She returned to cable television with the recurring role of Meg Bannock in Magic City (2012–2013), created by her husband, Mitch Glazer.

Personal life 
Lynch has been married to producer and writer Mitch Glazer since 1992 and has a daughter, Shane, born in 1985, from a previous relationship.

Lynch and her husband have owned the Oyler House, architect Richard Neutra's desert retreat since 2014.

Filmography

Film

Television

References

External links

American female models
American film actresses
Living people
People from Golden Valley, Minnesota
Actresses from Minnesota
20th-century American actresses
21st-century American actresses
American television actresses
Female models from Minnesota
1959 births